Brick Hotel, also known as the Wilmington Trust Co., Georgetown Office, is a historic hotel located at Georgetown, Sussex County, Delaware.  It was built in 1836, and is a -story, seven bay, brick structure in a transitional Federal / Greek Revival style.  It has a one-story, rear kitchen wing, and a one-story wing attached to it and dated to the 1930s. It has a slate-tiled roof, double end chimneys, and a modern Greek Revival style verandah.  The exterior was altered in 1955, when it was converted from its original use as a hotel to its use as a bank building. In 2008, it was converted back to a hotel.  On August 28, 2021, the Brick Hotel closed permanently, with the building having been leased for office space.

The site was added to the National Register of Historic Places in 1979.

References

External links

Hotel buildings on the National Register of Historic Places in Delaware
Federal architecture in Delaware
Greek Revival architecture in Delaware
Hotel buildings completed in 1836
Buildings and structures in Georgetown, Delaware
National Register of Historic Places in Sussex County, Delaware